Nikolay Nikolayevich Tsukanov (born 22 March 1965) is a Russian politician, psychologist, businessman, electrical welder, former governor of Kaliningrad Oblast, and, between July 2016 and December 2017, President Vladimir Putin's plenipotentiary envoy to the Northwestern Federal District.

Nikolay Tsukanov was born in 1965 in the village of Lipovo, in the Gusev area of Kaliningrad Oblast, Russian SFSR, Soviet Union. Upon graduating from school in 1980 he entered a local special professional technical college (SPTU)) and obtained a specialist degree as an electrical welder. He served in the Soviet army from 1983 to 1985, in a space communications guard battalion stationed in Czechoslovakia.

At age 14 Tsukanov began working as a combiner's assistant, later becoming an electrical welder at the Micromotor factory in Gusev. After 1985 he began to gain prominence as a local Komsomol leader. In the early 1990s he became a relatively successful businessman, graduating in 1999 from the Higher School of Privatization and Entrepreneurship with a specialism in law. In 2002 he became a degree candidate in psychology.

In 2005 Tsukanov was elected mayor of Gusev, going on in 2009 to become head of the Gusev municipal area, a position in which he successfully improved living conditions within the rather economically depressed area. In March 2009 he became chairman of the Council of municipal formations of Kaliningrad Oblast. In 2010 he was elected secretary of the local political council of the United Russia party, and on 28 September 2010 he became Governor of Kaliningrad Oblast.

On 26 June 2018, Tsukanov replaced Igor Kholmanskikh as the presidential envoy to Ural Federal District.

References

External links
 Official website of the Government of Kaliningrad Oblast (in Russian)

1965 births
Living people
1st class Active State Councillors of the Russian Federation
Governors of Kaliningrad Oblast
People from Gusev
United Russia politicians
21st-century Russian politicians
Recipients of the Medal of the Order "For Merit to the Fatherland" II class
Recipients of the Order of Holy Prince Daniel of Moscow